Huangping County (Hmu: Wangx Zangx) is a county in the east of Guizhou province, China. It is under the administration of the Qiandongnan Miao and Dong Autonomous Prefecture.

Climate

References

County-level divisions of Guizhou
Counties of Qiandongnan Prefecture